Sageretia hamosa is a shrub with grey-brown or dark brown branchlets studded with hook-like thorns  It can be found in China provinces Fujian, Guangdong, Guangxi, Guizhou, Hubei, Hunan, Jiangxi, Sichuan, SE Xizang (Chayu), S Yunnan (Mengla), Zhejiang; and in India, Nepal, Philippines, Sri Lanka and Vietnam.

References
RHAMNACEAE (archived link)

hamosa
Flora of China
Flora of India (region)
Flora of Nepal
Flora of the Philippines
Flora of Sri Lanka
Flora of Vietnam
Taxa named by Adolphe-Théodore Brongniart
Taxa named by Nathaniel Wallich